Heather May North (December 13, 1945 – November 29, 2017) was an American actress, best known for voicing Daphne Blake in the Scooby-Doo franchise.

Early years 
North was born in Pasadena, California.

Heather was close with actress and voice talent Nicole Jaffe, voice of Velma Dinkley in Scooby-Doo, before her retirement. The two were roommates in 1969 and Jaffe was the one who encouraged her to audition for Daphne Blake.

Career 
North made her acting debut at the age of 11.

Her first film role was in Git! (1965). She later guest starred on The Monkees and The Fugitive, both in 1966, and on Green Acres in 1968.

Though she appeared in several live action films and TV shows, such as Jennifer Scott alongside Kurt Russell in the Disney film The Barefoot Executive (1971) and as Sandy Horton on Days of Our Lives from 1967 until 1972, she is largely remembered for her portrayal of Daphne Blake in the Scooby-Doo franchise. She took over the role from Stefanianna Christopherson in the second season of Scooby-Doo, Where Are You! and ultimately went on to voice the character in various installments of franchise for more than three decades.

Personal life and death 
North was married to H. Wesley Kenney, producer of the NBC daytime drama Days of Our Lives, from 1971 until his death in 2015.

North died of bronchiolitis on November 29, 2017, at her home in Studio City, California, at the age of 71.

Filmography

References

External links 
 
 
 Heather North at VoiceChasers

1945 births
2017 deaths
American film actresses
American soap opera actresses
American television actresses
American voice actresses
Hanna-Barbera people
Actresses from Pasadena, California
20th-century American actresses
21st-century American actresses
Respiratory disease deaths in California